Yangling District is a district of the city of Xianyang, Shaanxi province, People's Republic of China, located on the plains of Wei River.

History
Yangling received its name as the family burial site of founding emperor Yang Jian of the Sui Dynasty.

Starting in 1979, Yangling went through several administrative region changes until it became a district to the City of Xianyang in 1983.  In 1997 the Yangling High Tech Agriculture Sector Demonstration District was established in Yangling District as a testing ground for new agriculture technology and techniques.

Administrative divisions
As of 2016, this District is divided to 2 subdistricts and 3 towns.
Subdistricts
 Yangling Subdistrict
 Litai Subdistrict

Towns
 Wuquan
 Dazhai
 Rougu

Economy
Industrial Zone
Yangling Agriculture Hi-Tech Industrial Zone
Yangling Agriculture Hi-Tech Industrial Zone was approved as a national-level hi-tech development zone by State Council in 1997.

Tourism 
Tai Bai Mountains are located nearby Yangling district (35–40 km).

Education
Yangling is home to the main campus of Northwest A&F University (NWAFU), established in 1934 by Yang Hucheng who was the general of the Northwest Army under the Kuomintang.

References

External links
Official website of Yangling District Government

Districts of Shaanxi
Xianyang